AC Oulu (ACO) is a Finnish football club based in Oulu. Formed in 2002, the club have played four seasons in Finland's highest football league Veikkausliiga and 16 seasons in the second highest league Ykkönen. The club are currently playing in Veikkausliiga. They currently play their home games at Raatti Stadium, and the club colours are navy blue, and white.

History
AC Oulu was founded in 2002 as a joint initiative of the OLS, OPS, OTP and Tervarit clubs with the aim of bringing top level football back to Oulu. FC Oulu played in the Veikkausliiga in the early '90s as the most recent team from Oulu to play top-tier Finnish football. After four seasons in the Ykkönen, AC Oulu reached the Finlands highest football league Veikkausliiga in 2007. However, they were relegated back to the Ykkönen at the end of their first season in the top division. After two seasons in the second tier AC Oulu won promotion again to the Veikkausliiga at the end of the 2009 season after finishing top of the Ykkönen.

Having finished 11th in 2010 season the club were initially going to continue in the Veikkausliiga for the 2011 season. However, they were denied a league licence for financial reasons and therefore dropped down to the Ykkönen.

Current squad

Out on loan

Management and boardroom

Management
As of 28 January 2022

Boardroom
As of 15 September 2020

Statistics

Season to season

References

External links
 

 
Oulu
2002 establishments in Finland
Sport in Oulu